Steep Falls is a census-designated place (CDP) in the town of Standish in Cumberland County, Maine, United States. The population was 1,139 at the 2010 census. It is part of the Portland–South Portland–Biddeford, Maine Metropolitan Statistical Area. The town is part of Maine School Administrative District #6, which includes Bonny Eagle Middle and High Schools.

Geography
Maine State Route 11 crosses the Saco River into the community, heading southwest towards Limington and Limerick and north towards Naples. Maine State Route 113 coincides with Route 11 through the center of Steep Falls, then heads southeast towards Standish village and northwest towards Hiram and Fryeburg.

Climate
This climatic region is typified by large seasonal temperature differences, with warm to hot (and often humid) summers and cold (sometimes severely cold) winters.  According to the Köppen Climate Classification system, Steep Falls has a humid continental climate, abbreviated "Dfb" on climate maps.

Demographics

References

Census-designated places in Maine
Portland metropolitan area, Maine
Census-designated places in Cumberland County, Maine
Standish, Maine